Azov shad is a common name for several fishes and may refer to:

Alosa maeotica
Alosa tanaica